Sigurd Daniel Isaachsen Willoch (16 May 1903 - 20 March 1991) was a Norwegian art historian and director of the National Gallery of Norway.

Biography
He was born in Oslo, Norway. He was the son of Eivind Isaachsen Willoch (1866–1926) and Marie Wenneberg (1873–1951). He was the grandson of painter Olaf Isaachsen. He was a second cousin of both national aviation director Erik Isaachsen Willoch and Norwegian Prime Minister 1981–1986 Kåre Isaachsen Willoch.

Sigurd Willoch took the mag.art. degree in 1925 from the University of Kristiania. He worked as a research fellow from 1928 to 1933, taking the doctorate in 1932. He was the art critic for the newspapers  Aftenposten from 1935 to 1942 and   Morgenbladet 1945–46. 

He wrote considerably about Norwegian art and artists dating from the 19th century, including works about artists Olaf Isaachsen, Edvard Munch, Hugo Lous Mohr (1889–1970), August Cappelen (1827–1852)  and Thomas Fearnley (1802–1842). He also produced works which focused on the Art Society in Oslo and the  National Gallery of Norway.

He was employed as a curator at Akershus Castle in 1937 and held this position until he took over as director of the National Gallery of Norway  in 1946.  He was the director of the  National Gallery  from 1946 to 1973. 
He served on the National Gallery Board 1952–76, was a member and sometimes chairman of the Norwegian unit of Scandinavian Museum Association 1946–71, Norwegian member of the Comité International d'Histoire de l'Art (CIHA) from 1958 to 1973 and represented Norway for some years in  the  International Council of Museums.

Honors
He was made a member of the Norwegian Academy of Science and Letters in 1939 and was made a Knight  First Class of the Royal Norwegian Order of St. Olav in 1973.

Selected bibliography
This is a list of his most notable works:

Olaf Isaachsen. En overgangsskikkelse i norsk malerkunst (1926)
August Cappelen og den romantiske landskapskunst (1928)
Maleren Thomas Fearnley (1932)
Kunstforeningen i Oslo 1836-1936 (1936)
Nasjonalgalleriet gjennem hundre år (1937)
Edvard Munchs raderinger (1950)

References

1903 births
1991 deaths
People from Oslo
University of Oslo alumni
Norwegian art historians
Directors of museums in Norway
Norwegian newspaper journalists
20th-century Norwegian historians
Order of Saint Olav